The 2016–17 Omaha Mavericks men's basketball team represented the University of Nebraska Omaha during the 2016–17 NCAA Division I men's basketball season. The Mavericks, led by 12th-year head coach Derrin Hansen, played their home games at Baxter Arena and were members of The Summit League. They finished the season 18–14, 9–7 in Summit League play to finish in third place. They beat Fort Wayne and IUPUI before losing to South Dakota State in the Summit League tournament championship.

Previous season
The Mavericks finished the 2015–16 season 18–14, 10–6 in Summit League play to finish in third place. They lost in the quarterfinals of The Summit League tournament to Denver. They were invited to the College Basketball Invitational where they lost in the first round to Duquesne.

Roster

Schedule and results

|-
!colspan=9 style=| Regular season

|-
!colspan=9 style=| Summit League regular season

|-
!colspan=9 style=| Summit League tournament

References

Omaha Mavericks men's basketball seasons
Omaha
2016 in sports in Nebraska
2017 in sports in Nebraska